The allegations of intellectual property theft by China are contentious in United States–China relations and between the People's Republic of China and several other nations. China is regularly accused of state-organized economic espionage and theft of intellectual property, in violation of international trade agreements. The espionage and theft is not limited to business, but also academia and government. China has repeatedly and vigorously denied the allegations, stating that Western companies willingly transfer technology to get access to China's market. China however also state they are taking steps to address the concerns. In 2019, China banned forced technology transfers.

Overview
According to Derek Scissors of the American Enterprise Institute, Chinese firms have been able to spend more on production, undercutting the prices of global competitors, by leapfrogging the often costly research and development phase through intellectual property theft. According to James Lewis, senior vice president and director of the Center for Strategic and International Studies’ Technology Policy Program, "Chinese policy is to extract technologies from Western companies; use subsidies and nontariff barriers to competition to build national champions; and then create a protected domestic market for these champions to give them an advantage as they compete globally". After acquiring intellectual property, Chinese government subsidies and regulations helps Chinese companies secure market shares in the global markets at the expense of the U.S. 

Foreign companies in China are often induced or forced to partner with local companies. This has led to complaints of training "future rivals". Japanese and European rail businesses have, for example, stated that Chinese rail companies used technology from shared ventures to become big in high-speed rail. Another example is in wind power, where Spanish wind power producer Gamesa was required to manufacture parts using Chinese domestic producers; within years, the same manufacturers produced parts for domestic producers who soon eclipsed Gamesa through favorable loans and support. Besides recruiting foreign employees to share trade secrets, another method involves cyber espionage and hacking. One of the methods involves massive, broad hacks, such as 2021 Microsoft Exchange Server data breach, before sifting through the acquired data in search of valuable information. According to Microsoft, the large-scale hack was probably sponsored by the Chinese government. 

According to William Schneider Jr., "China has institutionalized a system that combines legal and illegal means of technology acquisition from abroad". The issue is not limited to the United States, but is also reported in Europe, and according to William Evanina, director of the National Counterintelligence and Security Center, China directs similar efforts towards other NATO members. According to CNN, some U.S. officials and analysts have pointed to China's Made in China 2025 plan as "a rubric for the types of companies whose data Chinese hackers have targeted".

In 2015, Chinese President and CCP General Secretary Xi Jinping and U.S. President Barack Obama had agreed neither government would "conduct or knowingly support cyber-enabled theft of intellectual property". This led to an 18-month decrease in Chinese hacking, ending with the increased trade conflicts under the Trump administration.

According to Adam Meyers, working for the cyber-security firm CrowdStrike, China's campaign of global cyber-espionage has increasingly targeted big repositories of data, like internet or telecom service providers, making it "more difficult to really pinpoint that they were doing economic espionage". Co-founder of CrowdStrike, Dmitri Alperovitch, stated in 2018 that China appeared to have ramped up its intellectual property espionage, after a decrease during the end of the Obama administration. According to Alperovitch, there has been an increase in hacks by China's Ministry of State Security, which he considers more skilled than the People's Liberation Army, which previously stood for most of the hacking. This shift from the PLA to the Ministry of State Security, as well as an increase in sophistication, has also been noted by U.S. intelligence officials.

A congressional estimate in the U.S. placed the cost of Chinese intellectual property theft at 225–600 billion dollars yearly. According to a CNBC survey, 1 in 5 corporations say China has stolen intellectual property within the previous year, while 1 in 3 said it had happened some times during the previous century. In 2020, FBI director Christopher Wray claimed Chinese economic espionage amounted to one of the largest transfers of wealth in human history. According to CBS, Chinese state-actor APT 41 has conducted a cyber operation spanning years, stealing intellectual property worth trillions of dollars from about 30 multinational companies.

Hacking allegations 

According to the New York Times, China's hacking campaigns first came to prominence in 2010, with attacks on Google and RSA Security, then later with a 2013 hack on the New York Times itself. 

A 2018 report by the Australian Strategic Policy Institute, looking at incidents from Germany, Australia and the United States, including the Rio Tinto hack, stated that China was likely to be in breach of its bilateral cyber espionage agreements. According to professor Greg Austin, from UNSW Canberra Cyber, the more concerning problem is not intellectual property espionage, which he believes is also practiced by the United States, but Chinese laws pressuring foreign corporations in China to hand over intellectual property. "That's a practice that Australia needs to pay more attention to, not the almost unstoppable practice of Chinese government theft of commercial secrets through espionage".

In 2022, the security firm Cybereason announced it had discovered Chinese government-linked hackers targeting sensitive data from over thirty technology and manufacturing firms in Asia, Europe and the United States since 2019. The Chinese embassy in Washington denied the allegations. The attacks were linked to the Winnti group, and is alleged by Cybereason to have seized hundreds of gigabytes of "sensitive documents, blueprints, diagrams, formulas, and manufacturing-related proprietary data".

Chinese enforcement efforts and litigation 
The number of IP cases prosecuted criminally in Chinese courts has been on a significant upward trend from 2005 to 2015, suggesting tougher enforcement of IP laws.

Foreign firms have been increasingly successful in litigating patent infringement suits in China, winning approximately 70% of the time in the period 2006 to 2011, and rising to approximately 80% in the late 2010s.

A joint China-United States customs action in 2017 uncovered 1600 instances of intellectual property theft in goods exported to the United States. China's customs office issued a statement saying it would "actively promote increased cooperation with customs administrations of all countries and regions to jointly fight and comprehensively manage" intellectual property rights.

In 2019, China adopted  new Foreign Investment Law banning forced technology transfers.

Despite making efforts in intellectual property protection in China, a major obstacle in prosecution is corruption in courts; local protectionism and political influence prohibits effective enforcement of intellectual property laws. To help overcome local corruption, China established specialized IP courts and sharply increased financial penalties.

U.S. enforcement efforts and litigation
Intellectual property theft was one of the reasons behind the China–United States trade war. 

In 2019, University of California, Santa Barbara sued Walmart, Amazon, IKEA, Bed, Bath and Beyond and Target for selling Chinese-made light-bulbs using illegally acquired patented U.S. technology.

In 2020, Huawei was indicted on charges of a decade-long operation to steal U.S. trade secrets, with the U.S. Justice Department stating Huawei has a "long-running practice of using fraud and deception to misappropriate sophisticated technology from US counterparts". 

After the Equifax breach, U.S. Attorney General William Barr stated "Unfortunately, the Equifax hack fits a disturbing and unacceptable pattern of state-sponsored computer intrusions and thefts by China and its citizens that have targeted personally identifiable information, trade secrets, and other confidential information". Deputy director of the FBI, Paul Abbate, alleged in 2022 that China runs "a massive, sophisticated cyber theft program", and that it "conducts more cyber intrusions than all other nations in the world combined."

The FBI had more than 1,000 cases of intellectual property theft involving individuals associated with the People's Republic of China open in 2020. According to Christopher Wray, the FBI opens a new Chinese counterintelligence investigation every 12 hours. According to the U.S. Department of Justice, 80 percent of its economic espionage cases involve the People's Republic of China.

See also
Industrial espionage
Intellectual property in China
Chinese intelligence activity abroad
Chinese espionage in the United States

References

Intellectual property infringement
China–United States relations